An eclipse is an astronomical event.

Eclipse may also refer to:

Places
 Eclipse Island (Queensland), Australia, an island of the Great Palm Island group
 Eclipse Island (Western Australia), a barren island near Albany

Arts, entertainment, and media

Films
 Eclipse (1934 film), by Hiroshi Shimizu
 Eclipse (1962 film), by Michelangelo Antonioni
 Eclipse (1994 film), by Jeremy Podeswa
 The Eclipse, or the Courtship of the Sun and Moon (1907), a film by Georges Méliès
 The Eclipse (2009 film), a 2009 film by Conor McPherson
 The Twilight Saga: Eclipse (2010), a film adaptation of the Meyer novel

Television
 Eclipse (TV series), a Mexican telenovela
 Eclipse Music TV, an Australian music television show
 "The Eclipse" (Heroes), a 2008 television episode
 "Eclipsed" (The Penguins of Madagascar episode)
 "The Day of Black Sun Part 2: The Eclipse", an Avatar: The Last Airbender episode

Fictional entities
 Chief Eclipse, a character in the anime series Kiddy Grade
 Eclipse, a Star Destroyer, spaceship in the Star Wars universe
 Eclipse, a caste in the roleplaying game Exalted

Music
 Eclipse Records, a record label
 Eclipse (Takemitsu), a composition by Japanese composer Toru Takemitsu
 Eclipse (band), a Swedish rock band
 ESP Eclipse, an electric guitar model
 The Eclipse (club), a nightclub formerly in Coventry, England
 Eclipse, a pseudonym of the Italian duo Bini & Martini

Albums

 Eclipse (Amorphis album)
 Eclipse (Autumn Tears album)
 Eclipse (CANO album), 1978
 Eclipse (Five Star album), 2001
 Eclipse (G.G.F.H. album)
 Eclipse (Glorium album), 1997
 Eclipse (Journey album)
 Eclipse (Smokie album)
 Eclipse (Twin Shadow album)
 Eclipse (Veil of Maya album)
 Eclipse (Violeta de Outono album), 1995
 Eclipse (Yngwie Malmsteen album), 1990
 Esenciales: Eclipse, by Maná
 The Twilight Saga: Eclipse (soundtrack)
 Eclipse (EP), an EP by EXID
 Eclipsed (album), a 2016 album by Fellowship Creative

Songs
 "Eclipse" (Pink Floyd song), from the 1973 album The Dark Side of the Moon
 "Eclipse" (Crossfaith song), from the 2013 album Apocalyze
 "Eclipse" (Hardwell song), 2015
 "Eclipse", from the 1974 album Back Home Again by John Denver
 "Eclipse", from the 2000 album Made Me Do It by The Haunted
 "Eclipse", from the 2000 album Welcome to Earth by Apoptygma Berzerk
 "Eclipse", from the 2005 album Robyn by Robyn
 "Eclipse", from the 2017 single album Kim Lip by Loona
 "Eclipse", from the 2019 Spinning Top (EP) by Got7
 "Eclipse", from the 2019 album Alien by Northlane
 "Eclipse", from the 2020 album Libra by Lali

Publications
 Eclipse Comics, an American comic book publisher
 Eclipse Magazine, a black-and-white anthology published by Eclipse Comics
 Eclipse Monthly, a full-color anthology published by Eclipse Comics
 L'Éclipse, a 19th-century French newspaper

Books
 Eclipse (Trumbo novel), a 1935 novel by Dalton Trumbo
 Eclipse (Banville novel), a 2000 novel by John Banville
 Eclipse (Bedford novel), a 2005 science fiction novel by K. A. Bedford
 Eclipse (Meyer novel), a 2007 book in the Twilight series by Stephenie Meyer
 Eclipse, a 2008 novel in the Warriors: Power of Three series by Erin Hunter
 Eclipse (Judge Dredd novel), a novel by James Swallow
 Eclipse Trilogy, a series of science fiction novels by John Shirley
 The Eclipse (James Fenimore Cooper), an 1869 autobiographical vignette by James Fenimore Cooper
 The Eclipse: A Memoir of Suicide, a 2003 memoir by Antonella Gambotto-Burke

Games
 Eclipse (board game), a strategy board game
 Eclipse: New Dawn for the Galaxy (video game), a 2013 video game

Other arts
 Eclipse (Sebastian), a 2003 sculpture by Jill Sebastian

Brands and enterprises
 Eclipse (breath freshener), a Wrigley brand of chewing gum and breath mint
 Eclipse (car electronics), a Japanese car audio and navigation brand
 Eclipse (cigarette), an American cigarette brand
 Eclipse (DVD brand), a line of DVD sets from the Criterion Collection
 Eclipse, a French film production company founded in 1906 by Charles Urban
 Eclipse Machine Company, Elmira, New York, an early partner of the Bendix Corporation
 Eclipse Counterbore Company, Detroit, Michigan, produced interchangeable pilot counterbores and other machining tools from 1917 to the mid-1990s.

Computing
 Eclipse (software), a software development platform 
 Eclipse Foundation, a nonprofit organization to develop Eclipse (software) projects
 Eclipse (software suite), ECSS Compliant Toolset for Information and Projects Support of Enterprises in Space
 ECLiPSe, a constraint logic programming system
 Alias Eclipse, a professional image-editing application
 Data General Eclipse, a line of minicomputers
 Eclipse ERP, distribution management software
 Eclipse Internet, an Internet service provider

Sport

Greyhound and horse racing
 Eclipse (greyhounds), a greyhound racing competition 
 Eclipse (horse), an 18th-century racehorse
 Eclipse Award, a horse racing award
 Eclipse Stakes, a horse race

Sporting grounds
 Eclipse Park (Milwaukee), a former baseball ground in Wisconsin, US
 Eclipse Park, the name of two former baseball grounds in Kentucky, US

Teams
 Louisville Eclipse, a professional baseball team
 Phoenix Eclipse, a professional basketball team

Transportation

Aircraft
 Eclipse Aviation, a defunct jet manufacturer based in Albuquerque, New Mexico, US
 Eclipse 400, a very light jet aircraft developed but never produced
 Eclipse 500, a very light jet aircraft produced from 2006 to 2008
 Eclipse Aerospace, a now-defunct predecessor company to Eclipse Aviation
 Eclipse 550, a very light jet aircraft produced from 2014 to 2017
 Phase 3 Eclipse, ultralight aircraft
 Sol Eclipse, a Brazilian paraglider design

Land vehicles
 Mitsubishi Eclipse, a sport compact car
 Mitsubishi Eclipse Cross, crossover, not related to sports car
 Wright Eclipse, a bus body

Watercraft
 Com-Pac Eclipse, an American sailboat design
 Eclipse (yacht), owned by Russian billionaire Roman Abramovich
 Eclipse, a trimaran sailboat designed by Robert B. Harris
 Celebrity Eclipse, a 2010 cruise ship
 Eclipse-class cruiser, a 19th-century class of British Royal Navy cruisers
 HMS Eclipse, the name of several British Royal Navy ships
 USS Eclipse (SP-417), a United States Navy patrol vessel in commission from 1917 to 1919

Other uses
 Eclipse (Ferris wheel), in Thorpe Park, Surrey, UK
 Eclipse plumage, a phase in the coloring of some birds
 Eclipse, a characteristic of light patterns in navigation

See also
 Eclipsed (play), a 2015 play by Danai Gurira
 Eclipsis, a consonant mutation in the Irish language
 Ellipse, a curve on a plane
 Ellipsis, a series of dots
 Total Eclipse (disambiguation)